The L.C. Adam Mercantile Building, also known as the Cedar Vale Historical Museum, is a historic building at 618 Cedar St. in Cedar Vale, Kansas.  It was listed on the National Register of Historic Places in 2007.

It is an example of Early Commercial architecture.

The building served the Adam Mercantile firm from 1904 to 1953;  it was acquired in 1970 by the Cedar Vale Historical Society.

References

Commercial buildings on the National Register of Historic Places in Kansas
Early Commercial architecture in the United States
Museums in Chautauqua County, Kansas